Pleisbach (in its upper course also: Logebach) is a river of North Rhine-Westphalia, Germany. It is a left tributary of river Sieg near Siegburg.

See also

List of rivers of North Rhine-Westphalia

References

Rivers of North Rhine-Westphalia
Rivers of the Westerwald
Rivers of Germany